Television stations in Slovakia broadcast in both DVB-T format (MUX-2 and MUX-3) and DVB-T2 format (MUX-1 and MUX-4). Broadcasting is mostly in the Slovak, state-owned channels have some dedicated broadcasting for ethnic minorities (always subtitled). Foreign language (with the exception of Czech) movies and shows are dubbed (rarely subtitled). Czech production is often broadcast in original, with the exception of juvenile programs. Sometimes, foreign language movies are broadcast with Czech dubbing. Czech television channels are also popular in Slovakia, received in paid DVB-T2 service (only ČT1, ČT2, Nova International, Prima Plus and Prima Cool), directly in border regions (all channels) or carried by cable companies and satellite operators (almost all channels). Most of premium channels like Filmbox, HBO, Viasat Channels, etc. broadcast only in Czech. Discovery, Sport 1, Sport 2 and few others are exception, they broadcast in both Czech and Slovak.

Primarily terrestrial broadcasting

Public (state owned) channels 
{| class="sortable wikitable"
|-
! Network
! Website
! Launched
! Notes
|-
| JednotkaDvojkaŠport – sport channel:24 – news channel
| website
| 1993199320212022
| owned by Radio and Television of Slovakia (RTVS)all channels available in HD
|}

Main commercial channels 
{| class="sortable wikitable"
|-
! Network
! Website
! Launched
! Notes
|-
| MarkízaMarkíza Doma – dedicated to womenMarkíza Dajto – dedicated to menMarkíza Krimi – crime-themed channel
| websitewebsitewebsitewebsite
| 1996200920122022
| owned by Markíza Slovakia (PPF Group)all channels available in HD
|-
| TV JOJJOJ PLUS – dedicated to younger menJOJ WAU – crime-themed channelJOJ Cinema – film channelŤUKI TV – dedicated to childrenJOJKO – dedicated to childrenJOJ Šport – sport channelJOJ 24 – news channel
| websitewebsitewebsitewebsitewebsitewebsitewebsitewebsite
| 20022008201320152015202020212022
| owned by JOJ Group (J&T)
|-
| Nova International
| website
| 2016
| owned by Nova Group (PPF Group)broadcasting Czech TV Nova’s programs in Slovakiaavailable in HD
|-
| Prima Plus
| website
| 2017
| owned by Prima Group (FTV Prima Group)broadcasting Czech TV Prima’s programs in Slovakiaavailable in HD
|}

Other Slovak channels 
{| class="sortable wikitable"
|-
! Network
! Website
! Launched
! Notes
|-
| TA3
| website
| 2001
| news channel
|-
| Duck TV
| website
| 2007
| dedicated to smallest children
|-
| TV LUX
| website
| 2008
| Christian channel
|-
| TV OSEM
| website
| 2010
| dedicated to astrology
|-
| Senzi TV
| website
| 2013
| dedicated to folk music
|-
| TV RiK
| website
| 2015
| dedicated to children
|-
| Arena Sport 1Arena Sport 2
| website
| 2015
| sport channels
|-
| LifeTv
| website
| 2016
| Christian channel
|-
| Park TV
| website
| 2017
| documentary channel
|-
| Folklorika
| website
| 2018
| dedicated to folk music
|-
| TV Romana
| website
| 2019
| dedicated to Romani people
|-
| Premier Sport 1Premier Sport 2
| website
| 2019
| sport channels
|-
| Lala TV
| 
| 2019
| dedicated to smallest children
|-
| HaHa TV
| 
| 2020
| comedy-themed channel
|-
| Strike TV
| 
| 2022
| comedy-themed channel
|-
| Turbo TV
| website
| 2022
| dedicated to children
|}

Regional terrestrial and cable channels 
{| class="sortable wikitable"
|-
! Network
! Region
! Website
|-
| TV Bratislava
| Bratislava
| website
|-
| Televízia Ružinov
| Bratislava
| website
|-
| Dúbravská televízia
| Bratislava
| website
|-
| Devínskonovoveská televízia
| Bratislava
| website
|-
| Západoslovenská televízia
| Bratislava
| website
|-
| Televízia Pezinok
| Pezinok
| website
|-
| Mestská televízia Trnava
| Trnava
| website
|-
| Bánovské televízne vysielanie
| Bánovce nad Bebravou
| website
|-
| Humenská televízia
| Humenné
| website
|-
| Televízia mesta Dolný Kubín
| Dolný Kubín
| website
|-
| Televízia Trenčín
| Trenčín
| website
|-
| Televízia Trenčianske Teplice
| Trenčianske Teplice
| website
|-
| Obecné televízne vysielanie Štrba
| Štrba
| website
|-
| Regionálna televízia Prievidza
| Prievidza
| website
|-
| TV Sen
| Senica
| website
|-
| Televízia Turiec
| Martin
| website
|-
| TV Raj
| Žilina
| website
|-
| TV Reduta
| Spišská Nová Ves
| website
|-
| TV Panoráma
| Žarnovica
| website
|-
| Televízia Močenok
| Močenok
| website
|-
| TV Poprad
| Poprad
| website
|-
| Hlohovská televízia
| Hlohovec
| website
|-
| TV Žiar
| Žiar nad Hronom
| website
|-
| Televízia Zemplín
| Zemplín
| website
|-
| Televízia Mistral
| Michalovce
| website
|-
| Bardejovská televízia
| Bardejov
| website
|-
| Televízia CENTRAL
| Nitra
| website
|-
| TV Považie
| Považská Bystrica
| website
|-
| Česko-Slovenská regionálna televízia
| Holíč
| website
|-
| Levická televízia
| Levice
| website
|-
| Ľubovnianska televízia
| Ľubovna
| website
|-
| TV Pohoda
| Nové Mesto nad Váhom
|
|-
| Malacká televízia
| Malacky
| website
|-
| i-TV
| Považská Bystrica
| website
|-
| TV Liptov
| Liptov
| website
|-
| VIO TV
| Banská Štiavnica
| website
|-
| RTV KREA
| Galanta
| website
|-
| TV Piešťany
| Piešťany
| website
|-
| Mestská televízia Ružomberok
| Ružomberok
| website
|-
| Kežmarská televízia
| Kežmarok
| website
|-
| Mestská televízia Partizánske
| Partizánske
| website
|-
| Turzovská televízia
| Turzovka
| website
|-
| Televízia Východ
| East of Slovakia
| website
|-
| TV ORAVIA
| Námestovo
| website
|-
| Vaša TV
| Čadca
| website
|-
| TV Nitrička
| Nitra
| website
|-
| TV Levoča
| Levoča
| website
|-
| Televízia Hronka
| Banská Bystrica
| website
|-
| TV Region
| Košice
| website
|-
| TV VEGA
| Košice
| website
|-
| TV7 Prešov
| Prešov
| website
|-
| Televízia Šurany
| Šurany
| 
|-
| TV Severka
| Žilina
| website
|-
| TV Komárno
| Komárno
| website
|-
| TV9
| Nitra
| website
|}

Cable & satellite television channels

Film 
{| class="sortable wikitable"
|-
! Network
! Website
! Notes
|-
| HBOHBO 2HBO 3CinemaxCinemax 2
| website
| owned by Warner Bros. Discovery
|-
| AMCFilm+
| websitewebsite
| owned by AMC Networks International
|-
| FilmBoxFilmBox ArthouseFilmBox ExtraFilmBox FamilyFilmBox PremiumFilmBox Stars
| website
| owned by SPI International
|-
| Film EuropeFilm Europe+
| website
| owned by Film Europe
|-
| CS Film / CS Horor
| website
| owned by Československá filmová společnost
|-
| Canal+ Action
| 
| 
|}

Entertainment 
{| class="sortable wikitable"
|-
! Network
! Website
! Notes
|-
| AXNAXN BlackAXN White
| website
| owned by Sony Pictures Television
|-
| Epic Drama
| website
| owned by Viasat World
|-
| E!
| website
| owned by NBCUniversal
|-
| CBS Reality
| website
| owned by AMC Networks International
|-
| Food NetworkTLC
| website
| owned by Warner Bros. Discovery
|-
| FashionBox
| website
| owned by SPI International
|-
| Fashion TV Czech&Slovak
| website
| owned by TV FASHION
|-
| Hobby TVMňam TVMňau TV
| websitewebsitewebsite
| owned by S&P Sales House
|}

Kids and teens 
{| class="sortable wikitable"
|-
! Network
! Website
! Notes
|-
| BoomerangCartoon Network
| website
| owned by Warner Bros. Discovery
|-
| Disney ChannelDisney Junior
| website
| owned by The Walt Disney Company
|-
| NickelodeonNicktoonsNick Jr.
| websitewebsitewebsite
| owned by Paramount International Networks
|-
| Jim JamMinimax TV
| websitewebsite
| owned by AMC Networks International
|-
| Baby TV
| website
| owned by Fox Networks Group
|}

Documentary 
{| class="sortable wikitable"
|-
! Network
! Website
! Notes
|-
| Animal PlanetDiscovery Channel EuropeDiscovery ScienceDTXHGTVInvestigation DiscoveryTravel Channel
| website
| owned by Warner Bros. Discovery
|-
| National Geographic ChannelNational Geographic Wild
| website
| owned by The Walt Disney Company
|-
| Crime & InvestigationHistory Channel
| website
| owned by A&E Networks
|-
| SpektrumSpektrum HomeTV Paprika
| websitewebsitewebsite
| owned by AMC Networks International
|-
| Viasat ExplorerViasat HistoryViasat Nature
| websitewebsitewebsite
| owned by Viasat World
|-
| CS HistoryCS Mystery
| websitewebsite
| owned by Československá filmová společnost
|-
| BBC Earth
| website
| owned by BBC Studios
|-
| Docubox
| website
| owned by SPI International
|-
| Fishing & Hunting
| website
| 
|-
| Love Nature
| website
| 
|-
| Nautical Channel
| website
| 
|-
| Travel xp
| website
| 
|-
| UP network
| website
| 
|-
| Wild TV
| 
| 
|}

International News 
{| class="sortable wikitable"
|-
! Network
! Website
! Notes
|-
| Al Jazeera English
| website
| 
|-
| Arirang TV
| website
| 
|-
| BBC World News
| website
| 
|-
| Bloomberg Television
| website
| 
|-
| CGTN Europe
| 
| 
|-
| CNBC
| website
| owned by NBCUniversal
|-
| CNN International
| website
| owned by Warner Bros. Discovery
|-
| DW
| website
| 
|-
| Euronews
| website
| 
|-
| France 24
| website
| 
|-
| NHK World-Japan
| website
| 
|-
| Sky News
| website
| 
|-
| TRT World
| website
| 
|}

Sport 
{| class="sortable wikitable"
|-
! Network
! Website
! Notes
|-
| Auto, Motor und Sport
| website
| version for Czech Republic and Slovakia
|-
| Canal+ Sport
| website
| version for Czech Republic and Slovakia
|-
| EurosportEurosport 2
| website
| owned by Warner Bros. Discoveryversion for Czech Republic and Slovakia
|-
| Fast&FunBoxFightBox
| websitewebsite
| owned by SPI International
|-
| Golf Channel
| website
| owned by NBCUniversalversion for Czech Republic and Slovakia
|-
| Nova Sport 1Nova Sport 2Nova Sport 3Nova Sport 4
| website
| owned by Nova Group (PPF)version for Czech Republic and Slovakia
|-
| Sport 1Sport 2Extreme Sports Channel
| websitewebsite
| owned by AMC Networks International
|-
| Sport 5
| website
| 
|}

Music 
{| class="sortable wikitable"
|-
! Network
! Website
! Notes
|-
| MTV GlobalClub MTVMTV HitsMTV LiveMTV 80sMTV 90sMTV 00s
| website
| owned by Paramount International Networks
|-
| Stingray DjazzStingray ClassicaStingray CMusicStingray iConcerts
| websitewebsitewebsitewebsite
| owned by Stingray Group
|-
| ÓčkoÓčko BlackÓčko ExpressÓčko Star
| website
| owned by Agrofert
|-
| Šlágr OriginálŠlágr MuzikaŠlágr Premium
| website
| 
|-
| 360 TuneBox
| website
| owned by SPI International
|-
| Retro Music Television
| website
|
|-
| Rebel
| website
|
|-
| Mezzo
| website
| 
|-
| Deluxe Music
| website
| 
|}

Defunct Slovak channels 
{| class="sortable wikitable"
|-
! Network
! Period of broadcasting
! Notes
|-
| S1
| 1990 - 1991
| generalist channel
|-
| TA3
| 1991 - 1992
| generalist channel
|-
| TV Sever
| 1993 - 2000
| regional channel
|-
| Danubius Cable TV
| 1995
| generalist channel
|-
| VTV
| 1995 - 2000
| generalist channel
|-
| TV Luna
| 1999 - 2001
| generalist channel
|-
| Music Box
| 2002 - 2013
| music channel
|-
| TVA
| 2003 - 2012
| advertising channel
|-
| Moooby TV
| 2004 - 2010
| quiz channel
|-
| TV Nautik
| 2005 - 2008
| quiz channelreplaced by Televízo
|-
| TV Patriot
| 2006 - 2012
| news from regions
|-
| Musiq1
| 2008 - 2015
| music channel
|-
| STV3
| 2008 - 2011
| sport channelpart of RTVSrelaunched in 2019 as Trojka
|-
| Televízo
| 2008 - 2009
| quiz channelreplaced by TV Živa
|-
| TV Živa
| 2009 - 2011
| quiz channel
|-
| Digi SportDigi Sport 2Digi Sport 3Digi Sport 4Digi Sport 5Digi Sport 6
| 2010 - 2021
| sport channels
|-
| Slovak Sport.TV1Slovak Sport.TV2Slovak Sport.TV3
| 2012 - 2015
| sport channelsreplaced by Arena Sport
|-
| TV Fooor
| 2013
| comedy-themed channel
|-
| IN TV
| 2015
| generalist channel
|-
| TV 213
| 2016 - 2018
| sport channel
|-
| Orange ŠportOrange Šport 2Orange Šport 3Orange Šport 4
| 2018 - 2021
| sport channels
|-
| Comedy House
| 2019 - 2022
| comedy-themed channelreplaced by Strike TV
|-
| Trojka
| 2019 - 2022
| dedicated to archived contentpart of RTVS
|-
| Chuck TV
| 2021 - 2022
| dedicated to electronic sports
|}

Most viewed channels
{| class="sortable wikitable" style="font-size: 100%"
|-
! Position !! Channel !! Share of total viewing (%)
|-
| 1 || TV Markíza || 18.1
|-
| 2 || TV JOJ || 12.0
|-
| 3 || Jednotka || 5.9
|-
| 4 || JOJ Plus || 5.0
|-
| 5 || Markíza Doma || 4.5
|-
| 6 || JOJ WAU || 2.0
|-
| 7 || TA3 || 1.6
|-
| 8 || Dvojka || 1.4
|-
| 9 || Trojka || 1.2
|-
| 10 || Markíza Dajto || 1.0
|}

Market share
{| class="sortable wikitable" style="font-size: 100%"
|-
!TV Group
!Whole-day share, 12+ (June 2022)
!Whole-day share, 12-54 (June 2022)
|-
| Markíza Group  || 21.68% || 23.97%
|-
| JOJ Group || 18.44% || 18.95%
|-
| Radio and Television of Slovakia || 15.37% || 11.41% 
|-
| Czech television channels || 11.77% || 9.07%
|-
| colspan="3"|Source:
|}

See also 
 List of Czech-language television channels
 Television licence

References